Kosmos 378 ( meaning Cosmos 378), also known as DS-U2-IP No.1, was a Soviet satellite which was launched in 1970 as part of the Dnepropetrovsk Sputnik programme. It was a  spacecraft, which was built by the Yuzhnoye Design Bureau, and was used to study the ionosphere.

Launch 
A Kosmos-3M 11K65M carrier rocket, serial number 47117-107, was used to launch Kosmos 378 into low Earth orbit. It was launched at 18:20:01 UTC on 17 November 1970, from Site 132/2 at the Plesetsk Cosmodrome. The launch resulted in the successful insertion of the satellite into orbit. Upon reaching orbit, the satellite was assigned its Kosmos designation, and received the International Designator 1970-097A. The North American Aerospace Defense Command assigned it the catalogue number 04713.

Orbit 
Kosmos 378 was the only DS-U2-IP satellite to be launched. It completed operations on 13 September 1971, before decaying from orbit and reentering the atmosphere on 17 August 1972.

References

Kosmos satellites
Spacecraft launched in 1970
1970 in the Soviet Union
Dnepropetrovsk Sputnik program